The 1928 Estonian Football Championship was the eight top-division football league season in Estonia. It was played as a knock-out tournament. Tallinna Jalgpalliklubi won the championship.

Round 1

Tallinn

Northern-Estonia

Southern-Estonia
Tartu Jalgpalliklubi

Western-Estonia

Central-Estonia

Regional-final

Round 3

Final

Top Goalscorer
 Eduard Ellman-Eelma (Tallinna Jalgpalli Klubi) - 2 goals

References

Estonian Football Championship
1